Londonderry was a constituency used for the Northern Ireland Assembly.

The seat was first used for a Northern Ireland-only election for the Northern Ireland Assembly, 1973.  Members were then elected from the constituency to the 1975 Constitutional Convention and the 1982 Assembly.  After the Assembly dissolved in 1986, the constituency was not used again, its area being represented by parts of East Londonderry, Foyle and Mid Ulster.

It usually shared boundaries with the Londonderry UK Parliament constituency, however the boundaries of the two constituencies were slightly different from 1983 to 1986 as the Assembly boundaries had not caught up with Parliamentary boundary changes.

For further details of the history and boundaries of the constituency, see Londonderry (UK Parliament constituency).

Members

Northern Ireland Constitutional Convention (1975) and Northern Ireland Assembly (1973, 1982)
In 1982, elections were held for an Assembly for Northern Ireland to hold the Secretary of State to account, in the hope that this would be the first step towards restoring devolution.  The seven members elected from the Londonderry constituency were:

Note: The columns in this table are used only for presentational purposes, and no significance should be attached to the order of columns. For details of the order in which seats were won at each election, see the detailed results of that election.

Elections

1982 Assembly Election

1975 Constitutional Convention

1973 Assembly Election

References

Constituencies of the Northern Ireland Assembly (historic)
Politics of Derry (city)
Historic constituencies in County Londonderry
1973 establishments in Northern Ireland
1986 disestablishments in Northern Ireland
Constituencies established in 1973
Constituencies disestablished in 1986